Jehan Mamlouk (born 10 January 1993) is a Syrian basketball player who plays in Tishreen SC since 2021 and in the Syria women's national basketball team. She studied at the Syrian Private University.

Professional career

Al-Thawra (2005–2007) 

Her sports career began in the year 2005, where she joined a summer school at  Al-Thawra Club in the Al-Qasaa district, where she used to live.

Al-Wahda (2010–2021)
 
Quickly with the women's team, after she proved her experience, she was nicknamed by the fans of Al-Wahda club (Messi Al-Wahda) due to her small size and speed. 

In 2010, she participated in FIBA Asia Under-18 Cup for Women held in Thailand.

Just after the Asian U18 Cup she was injured by the cruciate ligament, and after physical treatment and her perseverance to exercise, she was able to overcome the injury and return to the basketball halls.

In the seasons 2011–2016, she won the champions double with Al-Wahda 6 times and defended the title in both competitions.

She achieved with Al Wahda Club the runner-up title in the West Asian Women's Basketball Championship for the 2015 season.

Her last big club success so far was born in the 2019 season, when she reached the SWBL final, in which her club was defeated by her parent team Thawra.

Tishreen SC (2021–present)
At the beginning of the 2022 season, she transferred to the Tishreen SC Latakia.

Syria women's national basketball team
Her biggest achievements in the national team are qualifying for the West Asian Championship finals and participating in the 2021 FIBA Women's Asia Cup Division B.

Personal life
In 2017, she graduated from the Higher Institute of Dramatic Arts, Department of Theater Studies.

References

1993 births
Living people
Syrian women's basketball players
Point guards
Sportspeople from Damascus